The Climate of Courage is a 1954 novel by Australian writer Jon Cleary. It was his fifth published novel. It is set during World War II and involves a group of Australian soldiers who have returned from service in the Middle East.

Premise
The novel falls into two parts: the soldiers on leave in Sydney, where they engage in various romantic entanglements and experience the famous submarine attack on Sydney, then taking part in a patrol during the New Guinea Campaign.

Background
The book was based on Cleary's experiences in the army during World War Two, where he served in the Middle East and New Guinea. He said it took him ten years to write the book.  He admitted that he made some alternations to make the book more appealing to international audiences, as he felt it was more difficult for them to understand Australian culture:
It   means,   for   one   thing,   using   dialogue   that   is   more   universal   than   the  parochial   slang   your   characters   would naturally   use, or,   when   you do   use  slang   (and   an   Australian   writer   has to,   because Australians   use   so   much  slang   in   their   everyday  conversation),  you have   to   make   its   meaning   self  evident. Again,   an   Australian   writer   has  little   opportunity for satire   because  the   satire would   be   lost   on   the   reader  who   didn’t know   the  background. And   when   a   writer   has   pride   in   his  country,   as I   have,   he   must   see   that  that   pride   is   expressed   in   a   way   that  won’t   offend   the   pride   of   a   reader   in  another   country.

Reception
The book was very popular, selling 28,000 copies in the UK during its first week of publication.

Reviews were strong in London.

Adaptation
The novel was adapted for Australian radio in 1956 with a cast that included John Meillon.

References

External links
The novel was serialised in the Sydney Morning Herald in 1953 – List of Chapters
The Climate of Courage at AustLit (subscription required)

1954 Australian novels
Novels first published in serial form
Novels set during World War II
Novels set in Sydney
Novels set in Indonesia
Novels set in New Guinea
William Collins, Sons books
Novels by Jon Cleary